Interpeace is an international organization for peacebuilding which advances sustainable peace in two mutually reinforcing ways: (1) strengthening the capacities of societies to manage conflict themselves in non-violent and non-coercive ways; and (2) assisting the international community, particularly the United Nations, to be more effective in supporting peacebuilding. Interpeace tailors its practical approach and peacebuilding policies to each society and ensures that the work is locally owned and driven. Together with in-country partners and teams, Interpeace jointly develops peacebuilding programmes and helps establish processes of change that connect local communities, civil society, government and the international community. The organisation has worked in more than 20 countries in Africa, the Middle East, Europe, Asia and Latin America.

In 2017, Interpeace was granted ‘international organisation’ status by the Federal Council of Ministers of Switzerland.

As a strategic partner of the United Nations, with a representative of the United Nations Secretary General on its Governing Board, Interpeace is headquartered in Geneva, Switzerland and has offices located worldwide in support of its in-country peacebuilding and policy advocacy work.

History 
The origins of Interpeace date back to 1994, when the United Nations conducted a peacebuilding pilot project, called the 'War-torn Societies' project.
The project then transitioned to become an independent non-profit organization in 2000 now named Interpeace.

Interpeace's Track 6 Approach 
Interpeace facilitates social cohesion and conflict management by promoting positive interactions, communication and dialogue both within and also vertically between three levels, or “tracks”, of society. The three “tracks” are broadly differentiated by levels of influence and formal organisation, and can be summarised as follows:

Track 1: Political elites and decision-makers                      

Track 2: Civil society and local government organisations as well as influencers and institutions       

Track 3: Communities and individuals within the broader population

Connecting these tracks can help societies move towards a situation in which high-level policies and political decisions at national level are informed by the knowledge and experience of local communities, and which therefore reflect local realities. This is the essence of the “Track 6” approach: 1 + 2 + 3 = 6.

Strategy 2021-2025 - A Resilient Peace 
Interpeace’s current five-year Strategy (2021-2025), ‘A Resilient Peace’, aims to promote a world in which enduring peace is evident in the cohesion and resilience of citizens, the diversity and inclusion of communities, and the responsiveness and trustworthiness of State institutions. The Strategy is shaped as follows:

Strategic Aim 1: Rethink Peace 
The ways peace is built, assessed and funded.

Objectives:

 Re-framing Peace Processes
 Assessing Trust, Resilience and Inclusion
 Changing the way Peace is funded

Strategic Aim 2: Enhance Resilience for Peace  
Broadening the organisation’s global reach; strengthening the resilience of communities and the trustworthiness of State institutions; and championing inclusion, justice and the economic dimensions of peacebuilding.

Objectives:

 Expanding the global scope of our engagement and the breadth of local networks
 Safer communities and more trustworthy security institutions
 Enhancing inclusion and justice
 Integrating economic peacebuilding

Strategic Aim 3: Embedding Peace  
Instituionalising peace in State behaviour and in the international system, and putting self-sustainability at the core of every peacebuilding strategy.

Objectives:

 Anchoring change in the State
 A Peace-Responsive International System
 Modelling Peacebuilding’s Success and Sustainability

Structures and People

Governing Board 

 Amre Moussa (Chair since December 2021)
 Kate Gilmore (Vice-Chair since December 2020)
 Matthias Stiefel (Vice-Chair - Member since May 2020)
 Karina Vartanova (Treasurer - Member since June 2021)
 Agnes Abuom (Member since December 2019)
 Elhadj As Sy (Member since June 2020)
 Nathalie Delapalme (Member since June 2020)
 Staffan De Mistura (Member since June 2019)
 Simon Geissbühler (Member since June 2020)
 Hind Kabawat (Member since December 2020)
 Khaled Khiari (Member since June 2020 - Representing the United Nations Secretary General)
 John A. Kufuor (Chair Emeritus and Special Advisor)
 Martti Ahtisaari (Chair Emeritus)

Advisory Council 

 Afghanistan: Ambassador Nasir Ahmad Andisha - Permanent Representative of Afghanistan to the United Nations Office at Geneva
 Canada: Ambassador Leslie E. Norton - Permanent Representative of Canada to the United Nations
 Denmark: Ambassador Marianne Kress - Head of Department for Migration, Stabilization and Fragility of the Danish Ministry of Foreign Affairs
 Egypt: Ambassador Amr Abdellatif Aboualatta - Permanent Observer of the African Union to the United Nations Office in Geneva 
 Finland; Ambassador Kirsti Kauppi - Permanent Representative of Finland to the United Nations in Geneva
 Ireland: Ambassador Eamonn Mac Aodha – Charges d’affairs ad interim of the Permanent Mission of Ireland to the United Nations in Geneva
 Mexico: Ambassador Francisca Elizabeth Mendez Escobar - Permanent Representative of Mexico to the United Nations Office at Geneva
 Netherlands: Ambassador Lars Tummers - Deputy Ambassador of the Netherlands to the United Nations in Geneva
 Singapore: Ambassador Umej Bhatia, Permanent Representative of Singapore to the United Nations Office in Geneva and the United Nations Office in Vienna
 Sweden: Ambassador Anna Jardfelt- Permanent Representative of Sweden to the United Nations in Geneva

Leadership 

 Scott M. Weber - President
 Simon Gimson - Vice President and Chief Operating Officer
 Renée Lariviére - Senior Director of Programme Management
 Almudena Bartayrés Arcas - Senior Director of Global Operations and Chief Financial Officer
 Jean Paul Mugiraneza – Senior Director of Partnership, Programme Development & Innovation
 Dr. Rebecca Brubaker – Director of Policy, Learning and Advisory Services

Active Programmes

Country-based programmes

West Africa 
Côte d'Ivoire
Guinea-Bissau
Mali
Burkina Faso

Eastern and Central Africa 
Burundi
Ethiopia
Democratic Republic of the Congo
Great Lakes
Kenya
Rwanda
Somali Region

Middle East and North Africa (MENA Region) and Europe 
Yemen
Libya

Policy-based programmes

Principles for Peace Initiative 
The Principles for Peace is a global participatory initiative to re-frame the current narrow, exclusionary, and flawed way peace processes are understood and implemented. Principles for Peace is a collective effort to develop a new set of principles to better enable local, national and international actors to craft more inclusive approaches that result in long term sustainable peace.

Peace Responsiveness 
Peace responsiveness seeks to enhance the ability of actors operating in conflict affected or fragile contexts to be conflict-sensitive and to deliberately contribute to peace through their technical programming -in a manner that enhances collective impact, that supports inclusive, gender-responsive and locally- led change and that strengthens societal resilience to conflict and violence. 

Interpeace engages with partners in the humanitarian, development and stabilisation sectors to advance peace responsive approaches in practice, through translating abstract concepts into actual changes in policies, programmes, operations, mindsets and incentives

Rethinking Stability 
Interpeace is leading a two-year initiative called Rethinking Stability in partnership with the German Federal Foreign Office, the Bundesakademie für Sicherheitspolitik (BAKS), and The Atlantic Council. It will seek to revisit and question the conceptual and operational norms behind stabilisation efforts in the interests of improving the prospect of future work contributing to lasting peace.

Youth, Peace and Security (YPS) 
Interpeace strives to ensure that the work is driven, owned and lead by the youth themselves at the country level. Interpeace also engages in international policy and practice through presences in New York, Brussels and Geneva, committed to and investing in strategic partnerships that support the YPS agenda.

Among others, Interpeace is an active member of the Global Coalition on YPS, works closely with youth led peacebuilding networks such as the United Network of Young Peacebuilder (UNOY), is a supportive partner to the Office of the UN Secretary General’s Envoy on Youth (OSGEY), and works in tandem with civil society organizations with trust-based youth programming in diverse contexts.

Finance for Peace Initiative 
Interpeace is working with partners from the private sector, finance, government, and development institutions to create new frameworks, guidance and structures that can support the market conditions for greater investment in peace.  Through the Finance for Peace Initiative, Interpeace will seek to develop new partnerships, investment approaches and projects to address these challenges.

Interpeace Advisory Team (IPAT) 
Interpeace has a team of senior peacebuilding associates (Interpeace Advisory Team – IPAT) who support the organisation in maintaining the quality of its practical and policy work, and who provide external specialist advice linked to Interpeace’s peacebuilding methodology.

Peace Talks 
Interpeace also organises the annual Peace Talks in Geneva, held at the United Nations. These are designed in particular to provide the opportunity for the experiences of young peacebuilders and new peacebuilding practices to be shared with global and high-level audiences. Occasionally, Peace Talks are also held elsewhere internationally.

References

Peace organisations based in Switzerland
International organisations based in Switzerland
Maison de la Paix
Organisations based in Geneva